Eric Basaldua (born August 26, 1980, and sometimes credited as Ebas) is an American comic book artist

Career
Basaldua started his career at Top Cow studios working directly under its founder, Marc Silvestri, starting with backgrounds for him. He is also the brother of comic-inker, Rick Basaldua.

Basaldua's most recent interior artwork can be seen in Witchblade Annual #1.

Bibliography

Comics work includes:
 Blood Legacy; The Young Ones
 Magdalena Volume 2: Preview, #1-4
 Tomb Raider #46, 47
 The Darkness Vol.2 #7
 Darkness/Vampirella #1
 Darkness Volume 2 #7
 Darkness: Level #3
 Eric Basaldua 2006 Sketchbook
 Hunter-Killer #7, 8, 9
 Hunter-Killer: Dossier #1
 Witchblade #92
 Witchblade & Wolverine #1
 Ebas Convention Sketchbook 2007 "Ultimate Peepshow"
 Witchblade/Devi #1
 Ultimate Fantastic Four #56
 Witchblade Annual #1

Awards and recognition
September 2011 Inkwell Awards Ambassador (September 2011 – present)

References

External links

Eric Basaldua at Comic Art Community
Eric Basaldua at DeviantArt
Top Cow Profile
Official Fansite

1980 births
Living people
American comics artists